The Museum of Food and Drink (MOFAD) is a New York City educational non-profit and museum that seeks to change the way people think about food and drink. The museum's work explores "the ways food and beverage impact our culture, politics, economy, history, and more."

History
Dave Arnold founded and chartered the museum in 2005, but it remained an idea until 2011. In 2013, Arnold and museum Executive Director Peter Kim raised over $100,000 through a Kickstarter campaign for the museum's first exhibition.

The first exhibit, which debuted in New York in August 2013, was the result of the campaign: a 3,200 pound puffing machine, also called a puff gun. The puffing machine is part of a cereal-focused traveling exhibit.

In 2015, the museum gained the support of its first major sponsor, Infiniti, which helped fund a space for their first series of exhibitions. That space became known as MOFAD Lab, a 5,000-square-foot gallery space in Williamsburg, Brooklyn.

Before the COVID-19 pandemic caused a shutdown of museums in New York City, including the MOFAD Lab, MoFAD had announced a collaboration with The Africa Center for an exhibit entitled African/American: Making the Nation's Table. The museum held a series of public programs during the shutdown, and the exhibit ultimately opened in February 2022 and included the Ebony Test Kitchen.

The museum remains in search of a permanent home.

Gallery

References

External links

Food museums in the United States
Museums established in 2005
2005 establishments in New York (state)